Ortadoğu Analiz (meaning Middle East Analysis in English) is a Turkish bimonthly political commentary magazine founded in 2009. It covers political, economic, cultural and historical analysis, and current news from the Middle East.

History and profile
The first issue of Ortadoğu Analiz appeared in January 2009 with a special focus on the Gaza Strip in Palestine. In the first issue, the magazine was including independent academic commentaries, book reviews and an interview with an important political figure. The magazine is part of the Center for Middle Eastern Strategic Studies and is published by the Center on a bimonthly basis.

In 2013, the magazine changed its style. It not only abandoned to use reference and abstracts in commentaries but it also shortened commentaries. This change made the magazine less academic and therefore more close to public readers. It was previously published on a monthly basis.

List of editors
Tarık Oğuzlu, 2009-2013
Murat Yeşiltaş, 2013-2014
Ali Balcı, 2015-2018
Gokhan Bozbas, 2019
Mustafa Yetim, 2020
İsmail Numan Telci and Mustafa Yetim, 2021-

References

2009 establishments in Turkey
Magazines established in 2009
Magazines published in Ankara
Monthly magazines published in Turkey
Political magazines published in Turkey
Turkish-language magazines
Bi-monthly magazines